This article lists the presidents of the Provisional State Council and Presidents of Israel since the adoption of the Israeli Declaration of Independence in 1948.

Presidents of the Provisional State Council (1948–1949)

The Declaration of the Establishment of the State of Israel was proclaimed on 14 May 1948 by David Ben-Gurion, the Executive Head of the World Zionist Organization and Chairman of the Jewish Agency for Palestine.

As President of the Provisional State Council, the interim legislative and executive authority that served until the formation of Israel's provisional government, Chaim Weizmann served as the de facto head of state until his election as President of Israel in 1949.

Presidents of Israel (1949–present)

Eleven people have served as President of Israel, four of whom have served two consecutive terms and one, Yitzhak Ben-Zvi, was elected to three consecutive terms, although he died in office soon after the beginning of his third term. 

Isaac Herzog has been serving as the 11th President of Israel since 2021.

Notes

Timeline

Main biographical data

See also
President of Israel
List of prime ministers of Israel

References

External links
 The official website of the President's Office, data about former presidents
 List of Israeli presidents

Israel
Presidents
Israel